Ling Jie (born October 22, 1982) is a retired Chinese artistic gymnast. She was the 1999 World Champion on the balance beam, the 2000 Chinese all-around national champion, and the silver medalist on the uneven bars at the 2000 Olympics in Sydney.

Ling was also a member of the bronze medal winning team at the 2000 Olympics, but the medal was stripped by the IOC in 2010 after one of the Chinese team members, Dong Fangxiao, was found to be underage during the competition. In March 2012, the 1999 World Championship Team Bronze was forfeited by China and given to Ukraine in light of the same information.

She is the innovator of a skill on the uneven bars that bears her name in the Code of Points: the "Ling," a full pirouetting front giant starting and ending in the inverted grip.

References

External links
 

1982 births
Living people
Chinese female artistic gymnasts
World champion gymnasts
Medalists at the World Artistic Gymnastics Championships
Gymnasts at the 2000 Summer Olympics
Olympic silver medalists for China
Olympic medalists in gymnastics
Competitors stripped of Summer Olympics medals
Gymnasts from Hunan
People from Hengyang
Asian Games medalists in gymnastics
Gymnasts at the 1998 Asian Games
Olympic gymnasts of China
Medalists at the 2000 Summer Olympics
Asian Games gold medalists for China
Medalists at the 1998 Asian Games
Universiade medalists in gymnastics
Universiade gold medalists for China
Universiade silver medalists for China
21st-century Chinese women